Patrick "Pa" Morrissey (born 1981) is an Irish Gaelic footballer who played as a right wing-back for the Tipperary senior team.

Born in Bansha, County Tipperary, Morrissey first arrived on the inter-county scene at the age of twenty when he first linked up with the Tipperary under-21 team as a dual player before later joining the intermediate hurling and junior football sides. He joined the senior football and hurling panels during the 2005 championships. Morrissey immediately became a regular member of the starting fifteen of both teams and won one Tommy Murphy Cup medal.

At club level Morrissey is a one-time championship medallist with Galtee Rovers.

His brother, Colin Morrissey, also represented Tipperary in both hurling and Gaelic football.

Morrissey retired from inter-county football following the conclusion of the 2008 championship.

Honours

Player

Galtee Rovers
Tipperary Senior Football Championship (1): 2008
Tipperary Intermediate Hurling Championship (1): 2001

Tipperary
Tommy Murphy Cup (1): 2005
Munster Intermediate Hurling Championship (1): 2002

References

1981 births
Living people
Galtee Rovers Gaelic footballers
Galtee Rovers hurlers
Tipperary inter-county Gaelic footballers
Tipperary inter-county hurlers